The family of Donald Trump, the 45th president of the United States from 2017 to 2021 and owner of The Trump Organization, is a prominent American family active in real estate, entertainment, business, and politics. Trump, his wife Melania, and son Barron were the first family of the United States for the duration of his presidency. Trump's paternal grandparents, Frederick Trump and Elizabeth Christ Trump, had immigrated to the United States from Germany. Donald Trump's mother, Mary Anne MacLeod, came from the Hebridean Isle of Lewis, off the west coast of Scotland. Trump has five children from three wives, and 10 grandchildren.

Immediate family

Wives

Ivana Trump 

Ivana Marie Trump (née Zelníčková), the first wife of Donald Trump, was born on February 20, 1949, in Zlín, Czechoslovakia (now the Czech Republic). She was a fashion model and businesswoman who became a naturalized U.S. citizen in 1988. They were married from 1977 until 1990. Ivana Trump died at her home in New York City at age 73 on July 14, 2022.

Ivana was a senior executive of The Trump Organization for seven years, including executive vice president for interior design. She led the interior design of Trump Tower with its signature pink marble. Ivana was appointed CEO and president of the Trump Castle Hotel and Casino in Atlantic City and later became the manager of the Plaza Hotel in Manhattan.

Ivana Trump was vice president of interior design for the company, leading the signature design of Trump Tower. Afterwards, her then-husband appointed her to head up the Trump Castle Hotel and Casino as president.

Marla Maples

Melania Trump 

Melania Trump (née Knavs), the third wife of Donald Trump, was born on April 26, 1970, in Novo Mesto, Yugoslavia (present-day Slovenia). She had a lengthy modeling career and is the second foreign-born first lady of the United States, the first being Louisa Adams. They were married in 2005. Melania became a naturalized U.S. citizen in 2006. She did not immediately move into the White House when her husband became president, but remained at Trump Tower with their son Barron until the end of the 2016–2017 school year. He and his mother moved to the White House on June 11, 2017.

Children 

Trump has five children from three marriages: DonJr., Ivanka, and Eric Trump with Ivana Trump; Tiffany Trump with Marla Maples; and Barron Trump with Melania Trump.

First marriage 

Donald Jr., Ivanka, and Eric are Trump's three eldest children, from his first marriage with Ivana Trump.

Prior to the election, each of the siblings held the title of executive vice president at the Trump Organization. During the campaign, they served as surrogates for their father on national news programs. Following Trump's election victory, all three were named to the presidential transition team.

Following the inauguration, DonaldJr. and Eric took charge of the family's real estate empire. Ivanka moved to Washington, D.C., with her husband Jared Kushner, who was appointed to a senior White House advisory position.

Second marriage 

Tiffany Ariana Trump (born October 13, 1993) is Donald Trump's only child with Marla Maples. In 2016, she participated little in her father's campaign because she was studying sociology and urban studies at the University of Pennsylvania. Shortly after graduating, she made a supportive speech for her father at the Republican National Convention at age 22.

Third marriage  

Barron William Trump (born March 20, 2006) is Trump's youngest child and his only child with Melania Trump. In May 2006, Barron Trump was baptized at the Episcopal Church of Bethesda-by-the-Sea in Palm Beach, Florida. He attended the Columbia Grammar & Preparatory School in Manhattan. In addition to English, Barron is fluent in Slovene.

Barron is known to be a fan of soccer. He appeared in an Arsenal F.C. jersey and met D.C. United players at the White House Easter Egg Roll in April 2017. In September 2017, he was selected to join the U-12 team for D.C. United's Development Academy for the 2017–2018 season. As of February 2019, Barron played with the Arlington Soccer Association.

As of August 2021, he attended Oxbridge Academy, a private college-preparatory high school in West Palm Beach, Florida.

Grandchildren 

Donald Trump has 10 grandchildren. Donald Trump Jr. and his former wife Vanessa had five children, Ivanka Trump and her husband Jared Kushner three, and Eric Trump and his wife Lara two.

Ancestry 

According to biographer Gwenda Blair, the family descended from an itinerant lawyer, Hanns Drumpf, who settled in Kallstadt, a village in the Palatinate, Germany, in 1608, and whose descendants changed their name from Drumpf to Trump during the Thirty Years' War of the early 17th century. The last name Trump is on record in Kallstadt since the 18th century. Journalist Kate Connolly, visiting Kallstadt, found several variations in spelling of the surname in the village archives, including Drumb, Tromb, Tromp, Trum, Trumpff, and Dromb. There are no indications that other spellings of the name, including Trumpf, could be related to the Trumps.

Johannes Trump, born in the nearby village Bobenheim am Berg in 1789, had established himself by the early 1830s as a winegrower in Kallstadt where his grandson, Friedrich Trump, the grandfather of Donald Trump, was born in 1869. Several of his descendants also were vintners in Kallstadt, one of many villages in the famous wine-growing region of the Palatinate (Pfalz). Johannes Trump's sister Charlotte Louisa married Johann Georg Heinz. Their son Johann Heinrich (John Henry) Heinz (1811–1891), who emigrated to the United States in 1840, was the father of Henry J. Heinz (1844–1919), founder of the Heinz company and Donald Trump's second cousin twice removed.

This German heritage was long concealed by Donald Trump's father, Fred Trump, who had grown up in a mainly German-speaking environment until he was ten years old; after World War II and until the 1980s, he told people he was of Swedish ancestry. Donald Trump repeated this version in The Art of the Deal (1987) but later said he is "proud" of his German heritage, and served as grand marshal of the 1999 German-American Steuben Parade in New York City.

The Trump family in Germany were Lutheran. Donald Trump's parents attended First Presbyterian Church in Jamaica, Queens, where Trump was confirmed in 1959.

Family tree 

  Johann Paul Trump (1727–1792), married Maria Elisabetha Setzer
 Charlotte Louisa Trump (1789–1833), married Johann Georg Heinz
  John Henry Heinz (1811–1891), emigrated to the United States in 1840, married Anna Margaretha Schmidt (1822–1899), emigrated to the United States in 1840
  Henry J. Heinz (1844–1919), founder of the Heinz company
  Johannes Trump (1789–1835), married Susanna Maria Bechtloff
 Johannes Christian Trump (1829–1877), married Katharina Kober (1836–1922)
 Friedrich Trump (1869–1918), barber, restaurant and hotel manager, married to Elisabeth Christ, moved to the United States in 1885/1905
 Elizabeth (Elisabeth) Trump (1904–1961), married William O. Walter
 John Whitney Walter (1934–2018), referred to as the Trump "family historian", married Joan Walter
 Christine Walter
  Nancy Walter
 Frederick Christ Trump (1905–1999), real estate developer, married Mary MacLeod (1912–2000)
 Maryanne Trump (born 1937), federal judge, married/divorced David Desmond; married John Barry
 David William Desmond married Lisa Aitken
 Frederick Crist "Freddy" Trump Jr. (1938–1981), TWA pilot, married/divorced Linda Clapp
 Frederick Crist "Fritz" Trump III (born 1962) married Lisa Beth Lorant
 Mary Lea Trump (born 1965), psychologist, author, married/divorced Dina Nowak
  Avary Trump
 Elizabeth Joan Trump (born 1942), married James Walter Grau

 Donald John Trump (born 1946), real estate developer, 45th President of the United States, married/divorced Ivana Zelníčková; married/divorced Marla Maples; married Melania Knauss
 Donald John "Donny" Trump Jr. (born 1977; of first marriage), married/divorced Vanessa Haydon
 Ivana Marie "Ivanka" Trump (born 1981; of first marriage), married Jared Kushner
 Eric Trump (born 1984; of first marriage), married Lara Yunaska
 Tiffany Trump (born 1993; of second marriage), married Michael Boulos
  Barron Trump (born 2006; of third marriage)
  Robert Trump (1948–2020), married/divorced Blaine Beard; married Ann Marie Pallan
 John George Trump (1907–1985), married Elora Sauerbrun (1913–1983)
John Gordon Trump (1938–2012)
Christine Trump Philp (1942–2021)
 Karen Trump Ingraham

Parents

Fred Trump 

Donald Trump's father, Fred Trump (1905–1999), born in New York, was a successful real estate developer in New York City. Using their inheritance, Fred Trump and his mother Elizabeth founded E. Trump & Son in 1927. The company grew to build and manage single-family houses in Queens, barracks and garden apartments for U.S. Navy personnel near major shipyards along the East Coast, and more than 27,000 apartments in New York City. Trump was investigated by a U.S. Senate committee for profiteering in 1954, and again by the State of New York in 1966.

Donald Trump became the president of his father's real estate business in 1971, and renamed it the Trump Organization around 1973. That year, Donald and his father were sued by the U.S. Justice Department's Civil Rights Division for violating the Fair Housing Act. In the mid-1970s, Donald received loans from his father exceeding $14million (later claimed by Donald to have been only $1million). Donald served as the Trump Organization's chairman and president until assuming the office of U.S. president.

Mary Anne MacLeod Trump 

Born as Mary Anne MacLeod (1912–2000) in Tong, a small village near Stornoway, in the Western Isles of Scotland, she was a daughter of fisherman Malcolm MacLeod and Mary MacLeod (née Smith). At age 17, she immigrated to the United States with $50 (equivalent to $855 in 2022), and moved in with a sister before starting work as a maid in New York. Mary and Fred Trump met in New York and married in 1936, settling together in Queens. Mary became a U.S. citizen in 1942. While visiting Scotland in June 2008, Donald Trump said in part, "I think I do feel Scottish."

Grandparents

Frederick Trump 

In 1885, Donald Trump's grandfather, Friedrich Trump, emigrated from Kallstadt, Palatinate (then part of the Kingdom of Bavaria), to the United States at age 16. He anglicized his name to Frederick in 1892 when he became a U.S. citizen. During the Klondike Gold Rush, he amassed a fortune by opening a restaurant and hotel in Bennett and later Whitehorse, serving gold seekers on their way to the region; one biographer wrote that the business included a brothel, a portrayal Donald Trump has said was "totally false". On attempting to return, Frederick was exiled by Germany in 1905 for his lack of mandatory military service and not giving authorities notice before his 1885 departure; an appeal was denied. He died in the first wave of the Spanish flu pandemic in 1918. After his death, his fortune was passed on to his wife and son.

Elizabeth Christ Trump 

Donald Trump's grandmother, Elizabeth Christ Trump, was born in 1880 and died on June 6, 1966. She married Frederick Trump in 1902 and moved to the United States with him. Like her husband, she was a native of Kallstadt, born as the daughter of Philipp and Marie Christ. Philipp Christ was descended from Johannes Christ (1626–1688/9) of Flörsheim, Hesse. Elizabeth Christ Trump was a descendant of organ builder Johann Michael Hartung (1708–1763) through her paternal grandmother Sabina Christ.

Siblings

Maryanne Trump Barry 

Maryanne Barry (born 1937) is Donald Trump's eldest sister. She was a senior federal judge on the Third Circuit Court of Appeals, became inactive in 2017 after her brother took office, and retired in 2019.

Fred Trump Jr. 

Frederick "Freddy"  TrumpJr. (1938–1981) was Donald Trump's older brother. On September 26, 1981, at the age of 42, he died from a heart attack.

Elizabeth Trump Grau 

Elizabeth Trump Grau (born 1942) is an older sister of Donald Trump. In 1989, she married film producer James Grau. She worked as an administrative assistant for Chase Manhattan Bank, before retiring to Florida.

Robert Trump 

Robert Trump (1948–2020) was Donald Trump's younger brother. He was a business executive who managed Trump Management Inc, the Trump Organization's real estate holdings outside Manhattan. He was an investor in SHiRT LLC, one of two owners of Virginia-based CertiPathx which was awarded a $33million government contract in 2019.

Robert Trump married Blaine Beard in 1980. They were divorced in 2009 after Trump had left his wife for Trump Organization employee Ann Marie Pallan. He married Pallan in early 2020. Trump died on August 15, 2020, at the age of 71. According to The New York Times, he had been having brain bleeds after a recent fall.

Other relatives

John G. Trump 

Donald Trump's paternal uncle John George Trump (1907–1985) was an electrical engineer, inventor and physicist who developed rotational radiation therapy, and, together with Robert J. Van de Graaff, one of the first million-volt X-ray generators. He was a recipient of Ronald Reagan's National Medal of Science and a member of the National Academy of Engineering.

John W. Walter 

Trump's first cousin John W. Walter (1934–2018) was a son of father Fred's sister Elizabeth Trump and William Walter. He worked for the Trump Organization for most of his life and was executive vice president of Trump Management, Inc. He shared ownership of All County Building Supply & Maintenance Corp with Donald Trump, Maryanne Trump Barry, Elizabeth Trump Grau, and Robert Trump. Walter also served as the mayor of Flower Hill, New York between 1988 and 1996, and as its historian from 1996 until his death in 2018.

Mary L. Trump 

Donald Trump's niece Mary L. Trump is a clinical psychologist, businessperson, and author who wrote a book about Donald Trump and the family titled Too Much and Never Enough (2020).

Summary table

References

Citations

Works cited 

 
 

Business families of the United States
German-American history
Donald
Political families of the United States